7-Methylxanthine demethylase is an enzyme with systematic name 7-methylxanthine:oxygen oxidoreductase (demethylating). This enzyme catalyses the following chemical reaction

 7-methylxanthine + O2 + NAD(P)H + H+  xanthine + NAD(P)+ + H2O + formaldehyde

7-Methylxanthine demethylase is a non-heme iron oxygenase.

References

External links 
 

EC 1.14.13